Bulbophyllum micholitzii is a species of orchid from New Guinea in the genus Bulbophyllum.

References

The Bulbophyllum-Checklist
The Internet Orchid Species Photo Encyclopedia

micholitzii